Capitol Heights is a community of nearly 200 townhouse and single-family duplexes in the Midtown neighborhood of Harrisburg, Pennsylvania.  Most of the new homes are located east of Third between Kelker and Reily and along Fulton, 4th and 5th street. The neighborhood is known for its generic suburban-style architecture fitted to the existing street grid. The area was previously referred to informally as "Lottsville" due to its many abandoned and vacant lots, so the City and private developers worked together in the 2000s as it was a targeted area for demolition and urban renewal.

References

Neighborhoods in Harrisburg, Pennsylvania